James Gordon Lyons (5 April 1876 – 26 December 1934) was an Australian rules footballer who played with Carlton in the Victorian Football League (VFL).

Notes

External links 

Jim Lyons's profile at Blueseum

1876 births
Australian rules footballers from Melbourne
Carlton Football Club players
1934 deaths
People from Carlton, Victoria